Fosterella albicans is a plant species in the genus Fosterella. This species is native to Bolivia and Argentina.

References

albicans
Flora of Bolivia
Flora of Argentina
Plants described in 1879